The Shire of Carnamah is a local government area located in the Mid West region of Western Australia, about  north of Perth, the state capital, and about  south of the city of Geraldton.

History
The Carnamah Road District was formed out of land previously managed by the Irwin and Mingenew Road Boards on 24 August 1923. On 1 July 1961, it became a Shire under the Local Government Act 1960. On 19 April 1962, it lost three-fifths of its area when the Shire of Coorow was created.

The Shire of Carnamah has seven elected Councillors. Councillors are elected by residents of the Shire and represent the whole Shire.

The President and Deputy President are elected by the Councillors after every election.

Elections are held in October every two years and half of the Council is due for re-election.

Towns and localities
The towns and localities of the Shire of Carnamah with population and size figures based on the most recent Australian census:

Population

Heritage-listed places

As of 2023, 70 places are heritage-listed in the Shire of Carnamah, of which one is on the State Register of Heritage Places, the Macpherson Homestead. The homestead, which was State Heritage-listed in April 1995, dates back to 1870.

References

External links
 
 Carnamah Historical Society

Carnamah